Marc Gracie is an Australian writer, producer and director of films and television, best known for his work in the comedy field.

In 2009 he won the 2009 Melbourne Underground Film Festival Best Director award for The Tumbler. 

He directed the original Wogs Out of Work stage production.

Blowing Hot and Cold (1988) - director
Jigsaw (1990) - director, writer
A Kink in the Picasso (1990) - director
A Slow Night at the Kuwaiti Cafe (1992) - director, writer
Crimetime (1993) - director
Full Frontal (1994) (TV series) - director, writer
Jimeoin (1994) (TV series) - associate producer, director
Eat My Shorts (1995) (TV series) - producer
The Adventures of Lano & Woodley (1997)(TV producer) - producer
Totally Full Frontal (1998-99) (TV series) - executive producer, director, writer
The Craic (1999) - producer
Sit Down, Shut Up (2001) (TV series) - producer, director
Jimeoin's Teatowel Tours: Northern Ireland (2001) (documentary) - producer, director
Shock Jock (2001-02) (TV series) - producer, director
Take Away (2003) - producer, director
You and Your Stupid Mate (2005) - producer, director
The Tumbler (2008) - producer, director, story
This is Your Laugh (2008) (TV series) - producer
With Tim Ferguson (2010) (TV series) - producer, director
Spin Out (2016) - producer, co-director

References

External links
 
Biography at Open Channel

Australian film producers
Living people
Year of birth missing (living people)
Place of birth missing (living people)
Australian film directors
Australian television producers
Australian television directors